"Burn Rubber on Me (Why You Wanna Hurt Me)" is a song originally performed by the Gap Band in 1980 and written by member Charlie Wilson, Rudy Taylor, and producer Lonnie Simmons.

Background
The song's lyrics refer to abandonment by a lover. The phrase "Burn Rubber on Me" itself refers to said woman driving off while her lover is away. The narrative is continued in "Early in the Morning".

Chart performance
In 1981, it peaked at number 84 on the Billboard Hot 100, and it was a number 1 hit on the R&B charts. Billboard magazine ranked it as the 12th biggest R&B single of 1981. A later single released, featuring "Humpin'" on the B-side, scored a number 19 appearance on the dance charts.

Inspiration
On June 30, 2021, Dave Grohl said that the drumming on "Smells Like Teen Spirit" was ripped off from the drum intro of "Burn Rubber on Me".

References

1980 songs
1980 singles
The Gap Band songs
Songs written by Charlie Wilson (singer)
Songs written by Lonnie Simmons
Songs written by Rudy Taylor
Mercury Records singles